Cryotherapy, sometimes known as cold therapy, is the local or general use of low temperatures in medical therapy. Cryotherapy may be used to treat a variety of tissue lesions. The most prominent use of the term refers to the surgical treatment, specifically known as cryosurgery or cryoablation. Cryosurgery is the application of extremely low temperatures to destroy abnormal or diseased tissue and is used most commonly to treat skin conditions.

Cryotherapy is used in an effort to relieve muscle pain, sprains and swelling after soft tissue damage or surgery. For decades, it has been commonly used to accelerate recovery in athletes after exercise. Cryotherapy decreases the temperature of tissue surface to minimize hypoxic cell death, edema accumulation, and muscle spasms, all of which ultimately alleviate discomfort and inflammation. It can be a range of treatments from the application of ice packs or immersion in ice baths (generally known as cold therapy), to the use of cold chambers.

While cryotherapy is widely used, there is little evidence as to its efficacy that has been replicated by or shown in large controlled studies. Its long-term side effects have also not been studied. However, there is a study that concludes that cryotherapy has a positive impact on the short-term recovery of athletes. Cryotherapy helped manage muscle soreness and facilitate recovery within the first 24 hours following a sport-related activity. Athletes who use cryotherapy within the first 24 hours to alleviate pain recovered at a faster rate than athletes who did not use cryotherapy after their sport-related activity.

Cryotherapy chamber 

There are different types of cryochambers, each with different mechanisms of action and uses. The Partial-Body Cryotherapy (PBC) makes use of nitrogen to decrease the temperature. This cryochamber is an individual, tube-shaped enclosure that covers a person's body with an open-top to keep the head at room temperature.

The second cryochamber is called the whole body cryotherapy (WBC) and makes use of electricity to reduce the temperature inside the chamber. In contrast to the first, the user fully enters the electrically operated chamber.

This is a specific type of low-temperature treatment used to reduce inflammation and painful effects.

Cryotherapy was developed in the 1970s by Japanese rheumatologist Toshima Yamaguchi and introduced to Europe, US and Australia in the 1980s and 1990s. Both cryochambers decrease the skin temperature, but WBC reaches lower temperatures than PBC and might be considered more effective.

Mechanism of action 
When the body is vulnerable to extreme cooling, the blood vessels are narrowed and make less blood flow to the areas of swelling. Once outside the cryogenic chamber, the vessels expand, and an increased presence of anti-inflammatory proteins (IL-10) is established in the blood. Cryotherapy chamber involves exposing individuals to freezing dry air (below −100 °C) for 2 to 4 minutes.

Main uses 
Proponents say that cryotherapy may reduce pain and inflammation, help with mental disorders, support exercise recovery performance and improves joint function. Cryotherapy chambers belong to the group of equipment associated with sports rehabilitation and wellness.

 Reducing the symptoms of eczema

Cryosurgery 

Cryosurgery is the application of extreme cold to destroy abnormal or diseased tissue. The application of ultra-cold liquid causes damage to the treated tissue due to intracellular ice formation. The degree of damage depends upon the minimum temperature achieved and the rate of cooling. Cryosurgery is used to treat a number of diseases and disorders, most especially skin conditions like warts, moles, skin tags and solar keratoses.  Liquid nitrogen is usually used to freeze the tissues at the cellular level. The procedure is used often as it is relatively easy and quick, can be done in the doctors surgery, and is deemed quite low risk. If a cancerous lesion is suspected then excision rather than cryosurgery may be deemed more appropriate.

Ice pack therapy 

Ice pack therapy is a treatment of cold temperatures to an injured area of the body. Though the therapy is extensively used, and it is agreed that it alleviates symptoms, testing has produced conflicting results about its efficacy and possibility of producing undesirable results() .

An ice pack is placed over an injured area and is intended to absorb heat of a closed traumatic or Edematous injury by using conduction to transfer thermal energy. The physiologic effects of cold application include immediate vasoconstriction with reflexive vasodilation, decreased local metabolism and enzymatic activity, and decreased oxygen demand. Cold decreases muscle spindle fiber activity and slows nerve conduction velocity; therefore, it is often used to decrease spasticity and muscle guarding. It is commonly used to alleviate the pain of minor injuries, as well as decrease muscle soreness. The use of ice packs in treatment decreases the blood flow most rapidly at the beginning of the cooling period, this occurs as a result of vasoconstriction, the initial reflex sympathetic activity.

Ice is not commonly used prior to rehabilitation or performance because of its known adverse effects to performance such as decreased myotatic reflex and force production, as well as a decrease in balance immediately following ice pack therapy for 20 minutes. However, if ice pack therapy is applied for less than 10 minutes, performance can occur without detrimental effects.  If the ice pack is removed at this time, athletes are sent back to training or competition directly with no decrease in performance. Ice has also been shown to possibly slow and impair muscle protein synthesis and repair in recreational athletes. This is especially true for cold water immersion, but equivalent controlled studies have not been done to see if the same effects hold true for ice packs. Regardless, ice has been shown in studies to inhibit the uptake of dietary protein post-muscle conditioning exercise.

Cryotherapy following total knee replacement 
Total knee arthroplasty (TKA) is a common intervention for patients with end-stage osteoarthritis of the knee. Post-surgical management includes cryotherapy. Cryotherapy may slightly reduce the amount of blood loss and pain. It was generally safe and not associated with any serious adverse events. It may improve the range of movement at the knee in the first one to two weeks after surgery. Potential benefits of cryotherapy on blood loss, postoperative pain, and range of motion may be too small to justify its use, and the quality of the evidence was very low or low for all main outcomes. Well designed randomized trials are required to improve the quality of the evidence. In conclusion, the effectiveness of cryotherapy is unclear.

Cold spray anesthetics 

In addition to their use in cryosurgery, several types of cold aerosol sprays are used for short-term pain relief. Unlike other cold modalities, it doesn’t produce similar physiological effects due to the fact it decreases skin temperature, not muscle temperature. It reflexively inhibits underling muscle by using evaporation to cool the area. Ordinary spray cans containing tetrafluoroethane, dimethyl ether, or similar substances, are used to numb the skin prior to or possibly in place of local anesthetic injections, and prior to other needles, small incisions, sutures, and so on. Other products containing chloroethane are used to ease sports injuries, similar to ice pack therapy.

Whole body cryotherapy 

An increasing amount of research is done on the effects of whole-body cryotherapy (WBC) on exercise, beauty, and health. Research is often inconsistent because the usage of the different types of cryo-chambers, and different treatment periods. However, it becomes increasingly clear that WBC has a positive effect on muscle soreness and decreases the recovery time after exercise. Some older papers show inconsistencies in the effects.

Cryotherapy is also increasingly used as a non-drug treatment against rheumatoid arthritis, stress, anxiety, or chronic pain,  multiple sclerosis and fibromyalgia. Studies for these, and other diseases (Alzheimer's, migraines), are ongoing although more evidence becomes available on the positive effects of Whole Body Cryotherapy. The FDA points out that the effects of Whole Body Cryotherapy lacks evidence and should be researched more.

Cryotherapy treatment involves exposing individuals to extremely cold dry air (below −100 °C) for two to four minutes. To achieve the subzero temperatures required for WBC, two methods are typically used: liquid nitrogen and refrigerated cold air. During these exposures, individuals wear minimal clothing, which usually consists of shorts for males, and shorts and a crop top for females. Gloves, a woollen headband covering the ears, and a nose and mouth mask, in addition to dry shoes and socks, are commonly worn to reduce the risk of cold-related injury. The first WBC chamber was built in Japan in the late 1970s, introduced to Europe in the 1980s, and has been used in the US and Australia in the past decade.

Adverse effects 

Reviews of whole body cryotherapy have called for research studies to implement active surveillance of adverse events, which are suspected of being underreported. If the cold temperatures are produced by evaporating liquid nitrogen, there is the risk of inert gas asphyxiation as well as frostbite. However, these risks are irrelevant in the electronically operated chambers.

Partial body

Partial body cryotherapy (PBC) devices also exist. If the cold temperatures are produced by evaporating liquid nitrogen, there is the risk of inert gas asphyxiation as well as frostbite.

See also 
 Cryonics
 Cold shock response
 Cold compression therapy
 Freeze spray

References

External links 
 

 
Alternative medical treatments